Richland Mall is a shopping mall in Ontario, Ohio, near the city of Mansfield, Ohio. The mall opened in 1969. The anchor stores are Avita Ontario Hospital and JCPenney. There are 2 vacant anchor stores that were once Sears and Macy's. It is managed by Madison Marquette.

History
The mall opened in 1969 in the Mansfield suburb of Ontario near US 30. It occupied a 64-acre site, with Lazarus, Sears, and O'Neil's (later May Company Ohio, then Kaufmann's) as its anchor stores. Jacobs Visconsi Jacobs developed the property, and first announced it in 1966. The Lazarus store was their first location outside the Columbus, Ohio market.

A 1997 expansion added JCPenney and 108,000 square feet of retail space. The Lazarus store was re-branded Lazarus-Macy's in 2003, and then just Macy's in 2005. Only a year later, Macy's relocated from the former Lazarus to the former Kaufmann's. Macy's previous location in the old Lazarus was later repurposed as a haunted house. The mall in 2002 was renamed by Westfield Group as Westfield Shoppingtown Richland for a period of time, is once again called Richland Mall following the mall sale by Westfield Group to Centro Watt in 2006.

In 2012, Brixmor announced that they hired a new manager for this mall: Madison Marquette. Brixmor retained as mall owner.

In October 2013, Avita Health System announced their purchase of the former Lazarus store. The 17 acre former store was overhauled into state of the art doctors offices in December 2014. The space was chosen from the convenient location and the sturdy foundation.

In 2015, a judge ordered a sale of the mall after its then-owners Centro Richland LLC, accumulated $37 million in debts. In early March 2017, Avita Health System opened the final stage of their newest additions to the Avita Ontario Hospital including, a 7-bed ICU, a 19-bed inpatient wing, a 16-bed pre/post op area, 4 surgical suites, and a full service cafe/kitchen. In 2018, the mall was sold by Wells Fargo to Richland Mall Holdings LLC. Mall management was retained.
On August 6, 2019, Sears announced they would be closing their Richland Mall location with liquidation sales starting on August 15 and closed in October.

In 2020, Chuck E. Cheese closed when the company filed for bankruptcy due to the COVID-19 pandemic.

On January 6, 2021, it was announced that Macy's would be closing in April 2021 as part of a plan to close 46 stores nationwide. It shuttered its doors on March 21, 2021. After Macy's closed its doors, JCPenney is the only traditional anchor store left.

References

External links
 Official website

Shopping malls in Ohio
Shopping malls established in 1969
1969 establishments in Ohio
Buildings and structures in Richland County, Ohio